The First Baptist Church is a Baptist church congregation currently meeting at 360 Canco Road in Portland, Maine.  It met for many years in a now-demolished 1867 church building on Congress Street, where the Top of the Old Port Parking Lot is now located.  That building was listed on the National Register of Historic Places in 1978, and was removed in 2015.

See also
National Register of Historic Places listings in Portland, Maine

References

Baptist churches in Maine
Churches on the National Register of Historic Places in Maine
Churches completed in 1867
19th-century Baptist churches in the United States
Churches in Portland, Maine
Demolished buildings and structures in Maine
National Register of Historic Places in Portland, Maine
1867 establishments in Maine
Former National Register of Historic Places in Maine